Keith Gerard Richard (born January 10, 1960) is an American college basketball coach. He is the current head men's basketball coach at the University of Louisiana at Monroe and a former head men's basketball coach at Louisiana Tech University.

Born in Baton Rouge, Louisiana, Richard earned a B.A. in business (1982) and M.A. in counseling (1986) from Northeast Louisiana University, now the University of Louisiana at Monroe. As a senior on the Northeast Louisiana basketball team, Richard started 29 of 30 games and averaged 4.5 points per game. Richard was on the Northeast Louisiana teams that won the Trans American Athletic Conference regular season titles in 1979, 1980, and 1982 and conference tournament in 1982.

Head coaching record

References

External links
Keith Richard Bio – ULM Athletics Official Athletic Site

1960 births
Living people
American men's basketball coaches
American men's basketball players
Basketball coaches from Louisiana
Basketball players from Baton Rouge, Louisiana
College men's basketball head coaches in the United States
Louisiana–Monroe Warhawks athletic directors
Louisiana–Monroe Warhawks men's basketball coaches
Louisiana–Monroe Warhawks men's basketball players
Louisiana Tech Bulldogs basketball coaches
LSU Tigers basketball coaches
Marshall Thundering Herd men's basketball coaches